Kleo Bare Metal Backup for Servers is a free file system cloning program created by Carroll-Net Inc. Kleo creates an all-inclusive backup of the operating system, device drivers and applications. Kleo is bundled with a LiveCD which includes tools for server recovery.

Operation 
Kleo is a graphical wizard file system cloning system. It is designed as a disaster-recovery tool, producing complete file system images. In the event a server experiences a hard drive failure, the LiveCD can be booted, and the previous backup image can be used to recover the server to the point in time of the last backup.

Kleo backups are file system aware backups. Unused blocks and empty space are not included which reduces the size of the backup image.  The backup images are also passed through gzip to further compress their size. But even with compression, backup images can be quite large. For this reason, they are not suitable replacements for daily backups and are typically only done whenever significant changes are made to a server's application set or prior to applying service patches and hotfixes.

Supported storage media 
 Hard drive
 USB/Firewire drive
 CIFS Windows network share
 SSH server
 NFS server

Supported file systems

Known limitations 

 Kleo does NOT support Ext4 which is the default on new Ubuntu installations
 The destination partition must be the same or larger than the source partition (limitation of the underlying partimage tool)

File format 
The file format written is a gzipped partimage file. The file extension is .KB2
The backup image is broken into 2 GB chunks to make it possible to store the backups on DVD.

See also 
 Disk cloning
 List of disk cloning software

References

External links 
 Official website
 Download
 Kleo support forum

Backup software
Cross-platform software
Live USB
Operating system distributions bootable from read-only media
Disk cloning